Enterobacter ribonuclease is an enzyme. This enzyme catalyses the following chemical reaction

 Endonucleolytic cleavage to nucleoside 3'-phosphates and 3'-phosphooligonucleotides with 2',3'-cyclic phosphate intermediates

This enzyme has preference for cleavage at CpA.

References

External links 

EC 3.1.27